Shringaverpur (singraur) is a village on Lucknow road,  from Allahabad in the Indian state of Uttar Pradesh. According to the folklore, Rama crossed the river Ganges at Shringaverpur on his way to exile along with Sita and Lakshmana.  The village is on the banks of the river.

Shringverpur is mentioned in the epic Ramayana, where it is described as the capital of the kingdom of Nishadraj or the 'King of Fishermen'. The excerpt 'Sita, Ram and his brother came to Shringverpur' can be found in Ramayan.

The excavation work done at Shringverpur has unearthed the temple of Shringi Rishi. It is widely believed that the village got its name from those sages. During the Mughal period, the Singraur group was formed to face the chaotic forces by the Kshatriyas of different dynasties, in which the Sage Vanshi Shringa Vanshi Sengar, Ror and Gaharwar Brahmakshatriya etc. Kshatriya clans were included in this group. The erstwhile name Singraur has been named after the Kshatriyas of Singraur group. The Ramayana mentions that Lord Rama, his brother Lakshmana and wife Sita, stayed for a night in the village before leaving for the forest on exile. It is said that when the boatmen refused him to cross the river Ganges, Nishadraj himself visited the site where Lord Rama was engaged in resolving the issue. He offered to give way to them if Lord Rama would let them wash their feet, Rama allowed and it is also mentioned that Nishadraj washed Rama's feet with the Ganges water and drank the water to show his devotion towards him.

A small temple has been built on the site where Nishadraja Ram is said to have worshipped Shivling.

There is a large very old hydraulic system in the village. The village has several old ruined walls and structures. It has also been said that a lot of treasure found by the government while excavation at the time of Indira Gandhi government.

There is a cremation centre on the bank of river. People from other places in Uttar Pradesh come to Shringaverpur for the cremation of their loved ones.

There is Also proposed a Museum, Library and Auditorium by Government of Uttar Pradesh.

Nishad Core Committee is working to get this to be a tourist place. The core members are Brijesh Kashyap, Shiv Sahani, Suresh Sahani, Dr. Ashok Nishad & other members of NCC (Nishad Core Committee)

New Block Of Allahabad 
In the year 2019, Uttar Pradesh Government divided the Kaurihar block of Soraon Tehsil and created a new block Shringverpur Dham.

References 

Villages in Allahabad district
Places in the Ramayana